Miloslav Masopust (born 26 September 1924) is a retired general of the Czechoslovak Army Corps in the Soviet Union.

Early life 
Miloslav Masopust was born on September 26, 1924 in Český Straklov in Volhynia, Dubno district. At the time, the city was part of Western Ukraine, which was occupied by Poland. Miloslav attended a Polish grammar school until the Soviet Union occupied the region in 1939. During the German-Soviet invasion of Poland, Miloslav witnessed a German pilot, who piloted a Czechoslovak aircraft, bomb train transports full of refugees and wounded soldiers.

Shortly after the occupation began, the Soviets disbanded grammar schools and replaced them with ten-year schools. Ukrainian grammar schools were re-established when the Nazis invaded in 1941. Miloslav continued his education at the Simeni Petljura Grammar School until it was closed down nine months after it was reestablished. He was able to find a job in a meat factory and avoided forced labor.

When the Nazis invaded, they set up a ghetto in Dubno where they sent all the Jews in the Western Ukraine. Eventually, after robbing them of their possessions, the Nazis transported the inhabitants to the site of an unfinished Soviet airfield near Dubno. After undressing them and forcing them into the pits designated for the construction of hangars, they were executed. Those who managed to escape the pits to a nearby village were eventually slaughtered along with the families housing them.

Czechoslovak Army Corps 
By February 1944, the Soviets were headquartered in Volhynia (now Northwest Ukraine) and locked in a stalemate with the Germans fortified behind the River Ikva near Dubna on high ground. Masopust crossed over the lines and joined the Czechoslovak army corps. He was trained and assigned as a squad leader of a squad of machine gunners.

After he was wounded at Krosno, he was sent to a vehicle operation course and assigned to the 5th Artillery Regiment, with whom he participated in the Slovak National Uprising as a supply troop commander.

Postwar 
After the war, Miloslav briefly worked as an administrator on an agricultural farm with his father.

In 1947 he applied to the Military Academy and served in leadership positions within artillery units. He ended his service with the rank of Brigadier General. He served as the vice-president of the Czechoslovak Association of Legionaries from 2002-2004. In 2015, at age 91, he married his second wife.

References 

1924 births
Living people
Czech generals
People from Volyn Oblast
Czechoslovak Army officers
Recipients of the Order of the White Lion
Czechoslovak military personnel of World War II